Cry Just a Little may refer to:

"Cry (Just a Little)", 2011, a song by Dutch dance duo Bingo Players
"Cry Just a Little" (E. G. Daily song), a track from the E.G. Daily 1989 album Lace Around the Wound 
"Letting Go (Cry Just a Little)", a 2012 song written and performed by singer Qwote and rapper Pitbull, the latter of whom is credited as Mr. Worldwide

See also
"Cry Just a Little Bit", 1983 song by British singer Shakin' Stevens